The Jets are a British rockabilly band, who had two charting singles in the early 1980s with "Yes Tonight Josephine" and "Love Makes the World Go Round". The songs reached numbers 25 and 21 respectively in the UK Single Chart, both tracks featured on their album, 100% Cotton. The band scored six other minor chart entries, but none managed to make the top 40. The Jets consists of three brothers, Bob Cotton (the eldest - double bass and lead vocals), Ray Cotton (the middle - lead Guitar and lead and backing vocals) and Tony Cotton (the youngest - drums and backing vocals).

The band continues to tour the club and Rockabilly circuit both in the UK and abroad and is still producing albums.

Discography

Albums

Singles

References

External links
 
 The Jets at Allmusic
 Official website (archived)

British rock music groups
Rockabilly music groups
Family musical groups
Musical groups established in 1978
EMI Records artists